Neville Francis "Nifty" Sellwood (2 December 1922 − 7 November 1962) was a champion  Australian jockey.

Early life
Sellwood was born on 2 December 1922 in Hamilton, an inner-suburb of Brisbane, Queensland.

Career
Sellwood was known for, among other victories, riding Delta and Toparoa to victory in the 1951 and 1955 Melbourne Cup races, respectively. He also rode Larkspur to victory in the 1962 Derby Stakes. 

The Neville Sellwood Stakes, hosted by the Australian Turf Club, was named in honour of him.

Death
Sellwood died after the horse he was riding slipped and fell on the track of the Maisons-Laffitte Racecourse on 7 November 1962, aged 39, in Maisons-Laffitte, France.

Honours
In 2002, Sellwood was inducted into the Australian Racing Hall of Fame.

References

Australian jockeys
People from Queensland
Deaths by horse-riding accident in France
Jockeys who died while racing
1922 births
1962 deaths
Australian Thoroughbred Racing Hall of Fame inductees

Jockeys from Brisbane
Sport Australia Hall of Fame inductees